Lepidiota consobrina, the consobrina cane grub, is a beetle of the family Scarabaeidae. It is a pest of sugarcane, and occurs from Mossman to Gordonvale (Queensland, Australia), changing from a one-year lifecycle south of Cairns to a two-year lifecycle further north.

References

Scarabaeidae
Beetles described in 1918
Beetles of Australia
Agricultural pest insects